Hillsborough railway station was on the Banbridge, Lisburn and Belfast Railway which ran from Knockmore Junction to Banbridge in Northern Ireland.

History

The station was opened by the Banbridge, Lisburn and Belfast Railway on 13 July 1863.  The station served Hillsborough, County Down.

The station closed on 30 April 1956.

References 

Disused railway stations in County Down
Railway stations opened in 1863
Railway stations closed in 1956
1863 establishments in Ireland
1956 disestablishments in Northern Ireland
Civil parish of Hillsborough, County Down
Railway stations in Northern Ireland opened in the 19th century